Lyse Chapel is a parish church of the Church of Norway in the eastern part of the large Sandnes Municipality in Rogaland county, Norway. It is located in the very small village of Lysebotn, at the end of the Lysefjorden. It is one of the two churches for the Forsand parish which is part of the Sandnes prosti (deanery) in the Diocese of Stavanger. The brown, wooden church was built in a long church design in 1961 using designs by the architects Gustav Helland and Endre Årreberg. The church seats about 150 people.

The church was consecrated on 28 May 1961 by the Bishop Fridtjov Birkeli. The church is not used often, since there are only about a dozen residents in the isolated village of Lysebotn. In 2009, the municipality of Forsand tried to close and sell the chapel, but they changed their mind due to the opposition of the residents.

The chapel was located in Forsand municipality until 1 January 2020 when it was merged into Sandnes Municipality.

Media gallery

See also
List of churches in Rogaland

References

Sandnes
Churches in Rogaland
Wooden churches in Norway
19th-century Church of Norway church buildings
Churches completed in 1961
1961 establishments in Norway